Warren Wheelock (January 15, 1880 – July 8, 1960) was an American sculptor. His work was part of the sculpture event in the art competition at the 1932 Summer Olympics.

References

1880 births
1960 deaths
20th-century American sculptors
20th-century American male artists
American male sculptors
Olympic competitors in art competitions
People from Webster, Massachusetts